The Blue Ribbon Commission on Race, Memorials and Public Spaces is a committee in Charlottesville, Virginia which the city established in 2016 to address the Charlottesville historic monument controversy.

In August 2016 Sue Lewis accepted an appointment to the commission.

By September 2016 various city projects had aligned with the work and research of the commission.

In November 2016 the commission published a recommendation to keep the monuments in place. Charlottesville mayor Michael Signer said that he supported and sought to follow the commission's "transform in place" recommendation.

References

External links

Report to City Council December 19, 2016, a report cited as a rationale for many choices regarding historic monuments
Race & Public Space Resource List, a resource collection presented by the University of Virginia School of Architecture in support of the Blue Ribbon Commission

Charlottesville historic monument controversy
Organizations based in Charlottesville, Virginia
Politics and race in the United States
2016 establishments in Virginia